Roseto Capo Spulico is a town and comune of the province of Cosenza in the Calabria region of southern Italy. 
Roseto was originally one of the satellite cities of Sybaris, at the time of Magna Grecia; it is the coastal areas of Southern Italy on the Tarentine Gulf that were extensively populated by Greek settlers.

Roseto Capo Spulico was named after the roses that were cultivated there.

The petals were used to fill the mattresses on which the sybaritic slept.
It is also known for The Church of the Immaculate Conception, built in the 15th century, a rustic, masonry church that sits on the edge of a cliff.

As a tourist destination, Roseto is known for its beaches and seaside resorts.

References

External links

Official website

Cities and towns in Calabria